Prezza may refer to:

Prezza, Italy, a town
John Prescott, British politician, nicknamed Prezza